The Old Brick Post Office in Wickenburg, Arizona was built between 1909 and 1915.  It served first as a grocery store and printing office, and eventually served as a post office.  It was the office of the newspaper the Arizona State Miner in 1940.

It was listed on the US National Register of Historic Places in 1986.

See also 
List of United States post offices

References 

Buildings and structures in Maricopa County, Arizona
Post office buildings on the National Register of Historic Places in Arizona
Government buildings completed in 1912
1912 establishments in Arizona
National Register of Historic Places in Maricopa County, Arizona